Divine is a 1975 French musical comedy film directed by Dominique Delouche and starring Danielle Darrieux, Jean Le Poulain and Martine Couture. A young man becomes obsessed with a famous entertainer, to the annoyance of his fiancée.

Cast
 Danielle Darrieux as Marion Renoir 
 Jean Le Poulain as L'imprésario Bobovitch 
 Martine Couture  as Antonia 
 Richard Fontana as Olivier Chalon 
 Candy as Agnès 
 Georgette Plana as Gigi 
 Raymond Gérôme as Le garçon de café 
 Dominique Leverd as L'acteur qui joue Ruy Blas 
 Christine Boisson

References

Bibliography 
 Dayna Oscherwitz & MaryEllen Higgins. The A to Z of French Cinema. Scarecrow Press, 2009.

External links 
 

1975 films
1975 comedy films
French comedy films
1970s French-language films
Films directed by Dominique Delouche
Films shot in Paris
Films set in Paris
1970s French films